Paul Richard "Richie" Ginther (Hollywood, California, August 5, 1930 – September 20, 1989 in France) was a racecar driver from the United States. During a varied career, the 1965 Mexican Grand Prix saw Ginther take Honda's first Grand Prix victory, a victory which would also prove to be Ginther's only win in Formula One. Ginther competed in 54 World Championship Formula One Grand Prix races and numerous other non-Championship F1 events.

Early career
Richie Ginther was born in Hollywood but his family moved to Ohio for his father's work before moving back to California and to Santa Monica, the same Californian town as future Formula One World Champion Phil Hill, and it was through Hill, a friend of Ginther's older brother, George, that he first began to race. After finishing school in 1948, Ginther followed in his father's footsteps and went to work for Douglas Aircraft, initially in the tool and die shop. In his spare time he helped Hill to repair, maintain and race his collection of old cars and hot rods, as Hill's racing career began to gather pace. Ginther made his race debut at Pebble Beach in 1951, driving a Ford-engined MG T-type sports car.

However, Ginther's career was put on hold shortly after, when he was drafted for two years of national service during the Korean War. During this time he received training and experience working in aircraft and engine mechanics, skills which he would later put to good use during his driving career. On emergence from the military, Hill requested that Ginther join him, principally as a riding mechanic, in driving a privately entered 4.1-liter Ferrari in the 1953 Carrera Panamericana. The pair ran high in the rankings until Hill lost control, crashed, and wrote off the car. Both Ginther and Hill were unharmed and returned in 1954 to take second place, beaten only by the works Ferrari of Umberto Maglioli.

Nineteen fifty-four was also the year that Ginther returned to race driving himself, mostly in a self-prepared Austin-Healey. His results were impressive enough that the following year VW and Porsche dealer John von Neumann hired him to drive a Porsche in domestic competitions. When von Neumann started dealing in Ferrari cars in 1956, Ginther also got the chance to drive these. In between working in von Neumann's Ferrari dealership — including trips to the Ferrari factory in Italy to sort customer problems — Ginther began to build an impressive racing reputation on the West Coast. This, and his choice of Ferrari mounts, brought him to the attention of the East Coast Ferrari franchise-holder, three-time 24 Hours of Le Mans-winner, Luigi Chinetti. Aside from importing Ferrari road cars, Chinetti also operated a successful race team, soon to metamorphose into Ferrari's official motorsport presence in North America: NART. Ginther first raced for Chinetti in 1957 and with him made his first appearances in international-level events, first in the 12 Hours of Sebring and then driving a two-liter Ferrari 500 TR in the  Le Mans race.

Also in 1957, Ginther was signed to drive the Aston Martin of Joe Lubin and over the next three years would continue to compete in many sports car racing events in both Aston and Ferrari machinery, with great success. That June, he won a 15-lap GT race at the new Lime Rock Park, and won the opening race of the national championship in his Ferrari. In early-1958, he piloted a two-liter Ferrari to victory at the County Fairgrounds in Pomona, California, averaging , and won in a three-liter GT in a five-lap qualifying preliminary for the SCCA Pacific Coast Championship. By the end of the year Ginther had captured the Pacific Coast Sports Car Championship outright. He triumphed by a wide margin at Pomona at the opening sports car race of 1959, in a von Neumann 4.1-liter Ferrari, and in June 1959, won in a three-liter Ferrari TR in the first Hourglass road races in San Diego, California. Throughout this period he continued to mix his race driving with a steady job at von Neumann's dealership, and by late 1959 the strain was beginning to show.

Formula One

Ferrari

Ginther made his F1 debut at the 1960 Monaco Grand Prix driving for Ferrari, which he stayed with through . In the September 1960 Italian Grand Prix in Monza, he placed second to Hill. Ginther led from the start until the 25th lap when Hill passed him and led until the finish.

Following the  season the Ferrari team gave up 1000 cc in engine size. The 2500 cc engine,
permitted the previous year, was replaced by a 1.5-liter rear-engine model, with 110 less horsepower. However, the newer engine was superior in both "profiling" and handling. The conservative Enzo Ferrari was the last major Formula 1 race car manufacturer to make the transition to cars with engines in the rear.
In 1961, Ginther was the No. 3 Ferrari driver, behind No. 1 Wolfgang Von Trips and No. 2 Hill. Giancarlo Baghetti occasionally piloted a fourth car. The team manager was Romulo Tavoni.

On May 14, 1961, Ginther finished second to Stirling Moss at the 1961 Monaco Grand Prix, 3.6 seconds behind, a few hundred feet. He was driving a new rear-engine Ferrari with a 120-degree V-6 which had a lower center of gravity. He eclipsed the previous course record of 1:39.6, before Moss took pole position the day after.

In August 1961, Ginther and Baghetti were teammates at the Pescara Grand Prix, a world auto manufacturers' championship event. Their Ferrari was leading on the 10th lap when it stopped on a straight stretch with a flat tire. Von Trips qualified first with Ginther taking the third starting position after Ricardo Rodriguez. Ginther retired in the race. Von Trips died in a spectacular crash on the second lap, which also killed eleven spectators, when his Ferrari climbed a  earth embankment. 
It brushed a wire fence employed to restrain a portion of the crowd and struck the spectators. Some who were injured eventually succumbed and brought the total to 15 deaths. The Ferrari team ceased competition until January 1, 1962, as a mark of respect to Von Trips.

BRM and Honda

In , Ginther switched to the British-based BRM team to race alongside Graham Hill. The highlight of his time at BRM was finishing equal-second (with Hill) in the 1963 World Championship. Ginther scored more points than his British teammate over the whole season, but only a driver's six best scores were counted towards the championship.

His reputation as a solid "team player" and excellent test and development driver earned him an invitation to join the works Honda F1 team for 1965, for whom he scored his one and only GP win, at the 1965 Mexican Grand Prix. The win was also Honda's first in Formula 1. Ginther averaged  over the curving  track in the 65 lap Mexico City event. His speed eclipsed the previous course record of  established by Dan Gurney in 1964. It was the first time Honda had entered the Mexican Grand Prix. Honda reentered international competition in the 1966 Italian Grand Prix. The team was three years old and had encountered difficulty in the preparation of a larger engine. Ginther led in Italy before his car crashed into a retaining wall and he broke his collarbone. He signed with the Eagle F1 team in 1967 and raced in the Race of Champions. His last race entered was the Monaco Grand Prix, but he failed to qualify.

Ginther won one race, achieved 14 podiums, and scored a total of 107 championship points.

He appeared in an uncredited role in the 1966 film Grand Prix as John Hogarth, a driver in the Japanese funded "Yamura" team. He also acted as one of the technical racing advisors for the movie.

While making an attempt to qualify for the 1967 Indianapolis 500, Ginther broke a fuel line in his American Eagle Indy Car.  A mix of ethanol and gasoline, was sprayed down his back.  This experience, along with the recent fiery death of close friend Lorenzo Bandini, along with other factors, led to his sudden retirement.

He participated in a rally with sixty-five other competitors, including actor James Garner, in June 1969. The California Sports Car Club event was three hours cross country from Los Angeles to Huntington Beach. It benefited students from the Braille Institute.
Ginther managed a Porsche 911S with two American drivers during the 39th 24 hours of Le Mans, in June 1971.

Death
Ginther died of a heart attack while on vacation with his family in France, in Touzac, near Bordeaux, on September 20, 1989.

Awards
He was inducted into the Motorsports Hall of Fame of America in 2008.

Biography
In 2020, to mark what would have been Ginther's 90th birthday, a biography was released about Richie's life and career by Richard Jenkins, published by Performance Publishing. "Richie Ginther: Motor Racing's Free Thinker" won the RAC Motoring Book of the Year Award for its depth of research and previously unpublished information

Racing record

Formula One World Championship results
(key) (Races in italics indicate fastest lap)

Non-Championship Formula One results
(key)

Complete British Saloon Car Championship results
(key) (Races in bold indicate pole position; races in italics indicate fastest lap.)

† Events with 2 races staged for the different classes.

Footnotes

References

External links
Biographical article and video on The Speed Blog
Richie Ginther | #18 of top-20 non-WDC F1 drivers

American racing drivers
American Formula One drivers
Ferrari Formula One drivers
Scarab Formula One drivers
BRM Formula One drivers
Honda Formula One drivers
Cooper Formula One drivers
Anglo American Racers Formula One drivers
Formula One race winners
24 Hours of Le Mans drivers
12 Hours of Reims drivers
World Sportscar Championship drivers
Racing drivers from California
People from Granada Hills, Los Angeles
1930 births
1989 deaths
Carrera Panamericana drivers